Originally known as Roxbury Park, Luna Park was an amusement park located near Johnstown, Pennsylvania, USA. Located by a loop at the end of the Franklin Street line of the Johnstown Passenger Railway Company, the park was centered on an artificial lake that was surrounded by a racetrack (originally for harness racing, but other forms of racing were presented there over the years) Throughout its existence, the park had picnic facilities. In 1905, the trolley park added amusement rides and attractions, including many that now are considered mainstays for such facilities. Locally popular, the park was beset with an instability of ownership until it was purchased by the City of Johnstown on 18 July 1922. Subsequently, the park's name was reverted to Roxbury Park. Eventually the mechanical rides and the racetrack disappeared from the grounds as Roxbury Park became a municipal park.

History
City founder Joseph Johns set aside land in the Point area of his embryonic town for use as public parks in 1800. Part of that land was Roxbury Park, which, by 1904, was a fenced-off amusement area that contained a horse racing track. When the Tri-County Driving Park Association defaulted on $40,000 in bonds, ownership of the land fell into the hands of stockbroker Frank Cresswell, who then quadrupled the rent on the Roxbury Race Track in 1904. Track manager John Pender responded by moving all of the track's scheduled races to nearby Westmont Race Track, ensuring that Roxbury would have a disastrous 1904 season.

After Cresswell attempted to persuade Pender to return to Roxbury, Roxbury Park was subsequently leased to an association of roughly 100 businessmen and community leaders, including the incoming mayor Charles Young. The association invested an additional $50,000 for facilities, including a merry-go-round, a roller coaster, a crystal maze, a laughing gallery, an "upside-down house," enhanced lakeside attractions (expanded lake and new boats), a vaudeville theater, and a grandstand that could seat 2000 people. Just before the grand opening on Memorial Day 1905, the park's name was changed to Luna Park.

Luna Park's initial year, capped by the 1905 Inter-State Fair (attended by 25,000 people) was successful, as was the second season. The Panic of 1907, a severe recession that started in 1907 and continued into 1908, had a devastating effect on the park's attendance figures in both years (including the cancellation of the 1908 Inter-State Fair), forcing the transfer of Luna Park's lease from its original ownership to a new partnership led by local brewer Ernest Emmerling in 1908. The races, picnics, and boxing matches that predated the park's grand opening continued to be Luna Park's main draw as the amusement park industry was contracting as the region's (and America's) economic difficulties slowly subsided.

While its popularity never returned to the heights it attained in 1905, the Johnstown Luna Park managed to outlast most of its contemporary namesakes despite uncertainty of ownership. A new "New Luna Park Amusement Company" was incorporated 5 April 1910. Capitalized at $10,000, the corporation was chartered for "buying, selling, or otherwise acquiring or disposing of real estate, for the purpose of erecting and operating thereon a scenic railway, dancing pavilion, and other amusements of a similar or cognate character, and generally to conduct the business of a recreation park."

In late 1914, the City of Johnstown was investigating the possibility of purchasing land for possible use as a municipal park. While the first attempt (to purchase  of land in nearby Constable Hollow) fell through, the city acquired parkland in northern Somerset County (later called Carpenter Park) after overtures toward buying Luna Park and Elk Run Park. In 1917, the city stepped up its attempts to increase its parkland, but an offer for a larger tract in Constable Hollow (188 acres for $50,000) was narrowly turned down by the City Council as the dissenting members preferred buying the land occupied by Luna Park instead. After the 1918 purchase of Highland Park, Johnstown mayor Joe Cauffiel urged the purchase of Luna Park. He reiterated his position in his second inauguration address (January 1920).

In 1921, trolley service to the park ended. On 18 July 1922, the City of Johnstown purchased Luna Park, its land, and an additional tract in Upper Yoder Township with an appropriation of $366,618 ($210,469 going to the heirs of Frank Cresswell, who still owned Luna Park's land). Subsequently, a vote of the Johnstown City Commission restored the Roxbury Park name to the still-open amusement park and gradually converted Roxbury Park into a municipal park. No trace remains of the racetrack or the amusement park itself.

References

1905 establishments in Pennsylvania
1922 disestablishments in Pennsylvania
Defunct amusement parks in Pennsylvania